Rangeele is the fourth studio album by the Indian fusion/Sufi band Kailasa, released in 2012. The album was launched on 10 January 2012. The track "Dharti Pe Jannat" features Amitabh Bacchan who narrates two lines in the song.

Track listing
All songs written by Kailash Kher and music by Kailash Kher, Paresh Kamath and Naresh Kamath.

Personnel
 Kailash Kher – Vocals
 Kabir Kher – Vocals
 Paresh Kamath – Guitars, Keyboards, Backing Vocals
 Naresh Kamath – Bass, Keyboards, Backing Vocals
 Kurt Peters – Drums, Percussions
 Sanket Athale – Percussions, Vocal Percussions, Backing Vocals
 Sankarshan Kini – Violin, Mandolin

Additional musicians
 Rinku Rajput – Keyboards
 Tapas Roy – Rabab, Saz, Mandolin, Oud, Santoor
 Sunil Das – Sitar
 Feroze Shah – Harmonium
 Kutle Khan – Mor Chang, Bagal Bacchha, Kartal
 Naveen Kumar – Flutes
 Ashwin Srinivasan – Flutes
 Kawa Brass Band – Brass section

References

External links
 Official website
 Kailash Kher's official website
 "Big B launches Kailash Kher's album 'Rangeele'"

2012 albums
Kailasa (band) albums